Ģirts Valdis Kristovskis (born 19 February 1962, in Ventspils) is a Latvian politician. He is a member of the centre-right Unity party.

Kristovskis served in several previous Latvian governments as the Minister for the Interior from 3 August 1993 to 28 October 1994, when he resigned), and the Minister of the Defense from 26 November 1998 to 9 March 2004. He was elected to the Saeima in four subsequent elections since 1993, being a member of Latvian Way party in 1993–1998 and a member of For Fatherland and Freedom/LNNK party in 1998–2008. At the 2004 European election he was elected as a Member of the European Parliament (MEP) for For Fatherland and Freedom/LNNK, but lost his mandate in the 2009 elections. Subsequently, he was elected to the Riga City Council where he was the leader of the opposition.

In 2008 he founded the centre right Civic Union party which became a founding member of the Unity coalition which won the largest mandate the 2010 Saeima elections. On 3 November 2010 Kristovskis became the Foreign Minister in the new Cabinet. In November, a scandal erupted in Latvia concerning the minister's correspondence with a doctor, who had expressed views perceived as Russophobic. Kristovskis survived the vote of non-confidence held on 9 November (36 deputies representing the opposition parties of the pro-Russian Harmony Center coalition and the right-wing For a Good Latvia voted for the proposal, with 51 deputies from the governing coalition voting against). Between 3 November 2010 and 25 October 2011 he served as the Minister for Foreign Affairs of Latvia. Kristovskis lost his seat in the Saeima as a result of the 2011 Latvian parliamentary election.

He is a signatory of the Prague Declaration on European Conscience and Communism, and co-sponsored the European Parliament resolution of 2 April 2009 on European conscience and totalitarianism.

References

1962 births
Living people
People from Ventspils
Latvian Way politicians
For Fatherland and Freedom/LNNK politicians
Civic Union (Latvia) politicians
New Unity politicians
Ministers of Foreign Affairs of Latvia
Ministers of the Interior of Latvia
Ministers of Defence of Latvia
Deputies of the Supreme Council of the Republic of Latvia
Deputies of the 5th Saeima
Deputies of the 6th Saeima
Deputies of the 7th Saeima
Deputies of the 8th Saeima
Deputies of the 10th Saeima
For Fatherland and Freedom/LNNK MEPs
MEPs for Latvia 2004–2009
Riga Technical University alumni
University of Latvia alumni
Recipients of the Order of the Cross of Terra Mariana, 2nd Class